Elisabeth Udolf-Strobl (born 12 April 1956) is an Austrian civil servant. She served as Minister for Digital and Economic Affairs in the Bierlein government.

Udolf-Strobl studied at Vienna University and the Diplomatic Academy of Vienna. From 1986 she was employed by the Austrian trade ministry. From 2018 she was a board member of Austrian Standards International. On 3 June 2019 she was sworn in as federal minister.

References

External links 
 

1956 births
Living people
People from Wels
University of Vienna alumni
Government ministers of Austria
Women government ministers of Austria
21st-century Austrian politicians
21st-century Austrian women politicians